Microsoft Online Services is Microsoft's hosted-software offering and is a component of their software as a service strategy. Microsoft Online Services are hosted by Microsoft and sold with Microsoft partners.

The suite includes Exchange Online, SharePoint Online, Office Communications Online, Microsoft Forefront, and Microsoft Office Live Meeting.

For businesses, the software as a service approach enables organizations to access the capabilities of enterprise software through on-premises servers, as online services, or a combination of both, depending on specific business requirements. Services also provide the option to add complementary capabilities that enhance on-premises server software and simplify system management and maintenance.

Product Suite: Business Productivity Online Suite (BPOS) 

The Business Productivity Online Suite Standard represents the first of a growing portfolio of Microsoft Online Services. Microsoft Online Services are a component of the broader Microsoft software as a service strategy that includes both Live and Online services.

Office 365 
The successor of BPOS is Office 365. Where BPOS is based on Exchange 2007 and MOSS 2007, Office 365 was originally built around the 2010 versions of Exchange and Microsoft Office SharePoint Server (MOSS) and now the 2019 versions, since one of the benefits of Office 365 is that it is 'evergreen'. For Instant Messaging, plus audio and video conferencing, Office 365 provides Skype for Business (formerly Microsoft Lync).

Apart from these communications and collaboration applications, Office 365 will also have Microsoft Office Professional Plus included, which is the regular Office pack. On top of that, online versions of Word, Excel and PowerPoint are provided 

Microsoft opened the Beta phase for this service in Q4 of 2010, and the service went live June 28, 2011

Support
Microsoft has set up a dedicated support department for BPOS outside their standard Professional Support Services. One reason can be that the type of support requests will differ from service requests for Microsoft products the customer runs on his own infrastructure: when a company opens a support question because they have problems with mail-sending using Outlook and their own Microsoft Exchange Server the technical side of such a support request is totally different from when the customer uses BPOS. Also, the expectations of the customer will be different: they have outsourced the services to Microsoft to avoid problems, thus when it doesn't work, they expect that Microsoft solves their problem quickly. For that reason, a dedicated BPOS and Office 365 support desk is in place in the US and in Ireland for the EMEA region. Microsoft's main support-providing partner HP has been busy finding and training new Tier 1 and Tier 2 support engineers for this desk. The EMEA support desk currently handles 1st line and escalated BPOS cases and is expected to support Office 365 cases after the product went live in June 2011.

Cloud computing and BPOS 
On March 4, 2010, Steve Ballmer gave a speech focused on Microsoft's cloud computing commitment at the University of Washington. Here is an excerpt from the Seattle Times, "The cloud fuels Microsoft and vice versa. 'About 75 percent of our folks are doing entirely cloud-based or entirely cloud inspired,' Ballmer said. 'A year from now that will be 90 percent.' This full embrace of the term cloud computing is new for Microsoft. Up until now, Microsoft was still pushing the term 'software as a service' to describe cloud software."

References

Online Services